Mary Sherman may refer to:

 Mary S. Sherman (1913–1964), American orthopedic surgeon and cancer researcher
 Mary Sherman (artist) (born 1957), American artist and curator
 Mary Sherman Morgan (1921–2004), American rocket fuel scientist